Deh Firuzvand may refer to:

Deh Firuzvand-e Bala
Deh Firuzvand-e Pain
Deh Firuzvand-e Vosta